Joseph Nan-Hong Kuo (Kaohsiung, 20 July 1935) is a Taiwanese film director best known for his Hong Kong based kung fu films of the 1970s and 1980s.

His debut screenplay Ghost Lake was one of the earliest Taiwanese language films. He later reshot the film.

Selected filmography
Ghost Lake (鬼湖 Gui Hu), 1958, (screenplay only)
Dragon Palace of Pu Island, 1962
Swordsman of All Swordsmen, 1968
Son of Swordsman, 1970
Jian nu you hun (Mission Impossible), 1971
The Mighty One, 1971
Triangular Duel, 1972
Chinese Iron Man, 1974
Deadly Fists Kung Fu, 1974
Shaolin Kung Fu, 1974
18 Bronzemen, 1976
The Blazing Temple, 1976
Return of the 18 Bronzemen, 1976
7 Grandmasters, 1977
The 8 Masters, 1977
Shaolin Kids, 1977
Born Invincible, 1978
The World of Drunken Master, 1979
Mystery of Chessboxing, 1979
The Old Master, 1979
Unbeaten 28, 1980
Shaolin Temple Strikes Back, 1981
36 Deadly Styles, 1982
Five Venoms vs Wu Tang, 1986

Personal life 
Joseph Kuo married his first wife in the year 1971. In 1972, his daughter, Jennifer Kuo, was born and in 1974, twins Steven and Stanley Kuo were born. He was divorced from his first wife in 1980 and went on to marry two more times. Jennifer went on to marry David Kott and have two children, Camille and Danielle. Steven and Stanley started their own families as well and have minimal contact with their father. Jennifer, on the other hand, has had no contact with her father in years.

References

External links

1935 births
Living people
Film directors from Kaohsiung